This is an incomplete list of newspapers published in Chad.

Newspapers 
 Abba Garde 
 
 Cloche, monthly
 Da'kouna, monthly
 Info-Tchad, weekly
 La Marche
 Le Messager du Moyen-Chari
 Le Miroir, bi-monthly
 N’Djamena al-Djadida 
 , bi-weekly
 N'Djamena Hebdo, est. 1989; weekly
 Notre Temps, est. 2000; weekly
 L'Observateur, est. 1997; weekly
 Le Progrès, est. 1993; daily, government-subsidized
 RAFIGUI Presse Jeunes
 Sarh Tribune
 Sud Echos, weekly
 Tchad et Culture, est. 1961; monthly
 Le Temps, est. 1995; weekly

See also
 Media of Chad
 Telecommunications in Chad

References

Bibliography

External links
 
 

 
Chad
Mass media in Chad
Lists of mass media in Chad